Paintsville City Hall was completed in January 1940 by the WPA, in order to house the city government, fire department, and police department of Paintsville, Kentucky. The structure is located at 101 Euclid Avenue in downtown Paintsville. It was added to the National Register of Historic Places on January 26, 1989.

In 2007, most of the city's government offices were moved to the old Citizens National Bank Building, which is located at 75 Main Street.

See also

National Register of Historic Places listings in Johnson County, Kentucky

References

City halls in Kentucky
National Register of Historic Places in Johnson County, Kentucky
Works Progress Administration in Kentucky
City and town halls on the National Register of Historic Places in Kentucky
1940 establishments in Kentucky
Government buildings completed in 1940
Paintsville, Kentucky